GHAR of Ghar may refer to:
 Grab Hands and Run, a 1995 novel by Frances Temple
 Ghar (film), a 1978 Bollywood film starring Vinod Mehra
 Ghar, Iran, a village in Razavi Khorasan Province, Iran
 Ghar al Milh, a coastal town and former port in northeastern Tunisia
 Għar Dalam, a prehistorical cul de sac located on the outskirts of Birżebbuġa, Malta
 Ghar al Milh, a coastal town and former port in northeastern Tunisia
 Għar Dalam, a prehistorical cul de sac located on the outskirts of Birżebbuġa, Malta